is a Japanese voice actor and musician from Mie Prefecture. He was attached to Office PAC until 2018.

Filmography
Bold denotes major roles

Anime
2000
 Boogiepop Phantom as Middle Schooler (ep 2)
2001
 Cosmic Baton Girl Comet-san as Shun Imagawa/Imashun
2002
 SaiKano as Nori
 Shrine of the Morning Mist as Handsome Boy B (ep 16)
 Knight Hunters Eternity (as (ep 1)
2003
 Wolf's Rain as Toboe
 Popotan as Younger brother (ep 10)
 Zoids: Fuzors as Ryukku
2004
 The Gokusen as Ichikawa (ep 7)
2005
 Gunparade Orchestra as Masatoshi Fukazawa
2006
 Wan Wan Serebu Soreyuke! Tetsunoshin as Hakase
 Gintama as God of Poverty (ep 89)
 Pururun! Shizuku-chan as Machamaro
 Kekkaishi as Majirou
2007
 Lovely Complex as Kazuki Kohori
2008
 S.A as Prince-like guy (ep 17)
 The Telepathy Girl Ran as Rui Ayase
2009
 Sengoku Basara as Ranmaru Mori
2010
 Beyblade: Metal Masters as Aleksei
 The Tatami Galaxy as Hippocampus (ep 6)
2011
 Bakuman 2 as Shoyo Takahama
2012
 Hiiro no Kakera as Shinji Inukai
2014
 Captain Earth as Puck
2016
 JoJo's Bizarre Adventure: Diamond Is Unbreakable as Toshikazu Hazamada
 Re:Zero − Starting Life in Another World as Tivey Pearlbaton

OVA
 Azusa, Otetsudai Shimasu! (2004) as Tanabe
 Wolf's Rain (2004) as Toboe

Video games
Baccano! (Apamu)
Danzai no Maria (Hiyori Kujōin)
Dark Chronicle (Tobo)
Dear My Sun!! ~Musuko Ikusei Kapuricchō~ (Fūto Shidō (Amae))
Galaxy Angel II (Bell Orchietette, Garam Azeat)
Hiiro no Kakera series (Shinji Inukai)
Laughter Land (Guillered)
Sengoku Basara series (Ranmaru Mori)
Zoids Struggle (Kane)
Zone of the Enders (Leo Stenbuck)

Tokusatsu
2012
 Tokumei Sentai Go-Busters as Puppetloid (ep 34)
2017
 Uchu Sentai Kyuranger as Inda (other by Tetsu Shiratori, Akihiro Matsushima) (ep 27)

Dubbing roles

Live action
#FollowFriday (Eric Cordon (Joseph Poliquin))
Race to Witch Mountain (Seth (Alexander Ludwig))
Unfinished Business (Mike Pancake (Dave Franco))

References

External links

1976 births
Living people
Actors from Mie Prefecture
Male voice actors from Mie Prefecture
Japanese male stage actors
Japanese male video game actors
Japanese male voice actors
Musicians from Mie Prefecture
20th-century Japanese male actors
21st-century Japanese male actors